The 1936 East Grinstead by-election was held on 23 July 1936.  The by-election was held due to the elevation to the peerage of the incumbent Conservative MP, Henry Cautley.  It was won by the Conservative candidate Ralph Clarke.

References

1936 elections in the United Kingdom
1936 in England
20th century in Sussex
East Grinstead
By-elections to the Parliament of the United Kingdom in West Sussex constituencies